Drzewce-Kolonia  is a village in the administrative district of Gmina Nałęczów, within Puławy County, Lublin Voivodeship, in eastern Poland.

References

Drzewce-Kolonia